= Kashedi =

Village in Maharashtra

Coordinates: 17°53′N 73°26′E

- Village
- Interactive map of Kashedi
- Country: India
- State: Maharashtra

Kashedi is a small village in Ratnagiri district, Maharashtra state in Western India. The 2011 Census of India recorded a total of 872 residents in the village. Kashedi's geographical area is approximately 882 hectares (2,180 acres).
